R v Hughes (also known as the Canadian Right to Food Trial) is an ongoing court trial on the right to food in Calgary, Alberta, Canada.
The initial court challenge that is the basis of the case started in March 2012. The decision is now under appeal to the Alberta Court of Queen's Bench. The next trial date is June 28, 2013, at the Calgary Courthouse.
The trial originates from a bylaw charge of possession of chickens in the city laid against Paul Hughes by the City of Calgary in 2009. Possession of chickens is illegal in Calgary as per the Responsible Pet Ownership Bylaw 27. While urban chickens are illegal in Calgary, they are legal in hundreds of other communities in North America and the raising of hens for eggs is an accepted practice in vast numbers of cultures around the world.

See also
International Covenant on Economic, Social and Cultural Rights

References

External links 
University of Calgary, Law Faculty

2012 in Canadian case law
2012 in Alberta
Alberta case law
Canadian criminal case law